The 2011 SBS Drama Awards is a ceremony honoring the best performances in television on the SBS network for the year 2011. It was held at the SBS Open Hall in Deungchon-dong, Seoul on December 31, 2011, and was hosted by actor Ji Sung and actress Choi Kang-hee.

Nominations and winners
Complete list of nominees and winners:

(Winners denoted in bold)

Top 10 Stars
Choi Kang-hee – Protect the Boss
Han Suk-kyu – Deep Rooted Tree
Jang Hyuk – Midas, Deep Rooted Tree
Ji Sung – Protect the Boss
Kim Rae-won – A Thousand Days' Promise
Kim Sun-a – Scent of a Woman
Lee Dong-wook – Scent of a Woman
Lee Min-ho – City Hunter
Lee Yo-won – 49 Days
Soo Ae – A Thousand Days' Promise, Athena: Goddess of War

New Star Award
Goo Hara – City Hunter
Im Soo-hyang – New Tales of Gisaeng
Ji Chang-wook – Warrior Baek Dong-soo
Jin Se-yeon – My Daughter the Flower
Jeong Yu-mi – A Thousand Days' Promise
Kim Jaejoong – Protect the Boss
Lee Jae-yoon – My Love By My Side
Seo Hyo-rim – Scent of a Woman
Shin Hyun-bin – Warrior Baek Dong-soo
Sung Hoon – New Tales of Gisaeng
Wang Ji-hye – Protect the Boss

References

External links
 

SBS
SBS Drama Awards
SBS
December 2011 events in South Korea